Extended newsvendor models are variations of the classic newsvendor model involving production capacity constraints, multiple products, multiple production cycles, demand dependent selling price, etc. that appear in the Operations management literature.

Further reading 
 E. J. Lodree: A Simulation Optimization Approach for the Two-Product Newsvendor Problem
 P. Mileff, K. Nehez: An Extended Newsvendor Model for Customized Mass Production, AOM  – Advanced modeling and Optimization. Electronic International Journal, Volume 8, Number 2. pp 169–186. (2006)
 P. Mileff, K. Nehez: Evaluating the Proper Service Level In a Cooperate Supply Chain Environment, MIM'07. IFAC workshop on manufacturing modelling, management and control. Budapest, Hungary. pp 123–126. (2007)

Inventory optimization